Səbətkeçməz (also, Sabatkechmaz and Sabetkechmaz) is a village in the Gadabay Rayon of Azerbaijan.  The village forms part of the municipality of Çaldaş.

References 

Populated places in Gadabay District